Ernst Karl Falkbeer (June 27, 1819 – December 14, 1885) 
was an Austrian chess master and journalist.

Life and chess career
Falkbeer was born in Brünn, a town that in 1819 belonged to Habsburg Austria, and which today is known as Brno in the Czech Republic. Falkbeer moved to Vienna to study law, but ended up becoming a journalist.  During the European Revolutions of 1848, he fled Vienna for Germany.  
He played chess with German masters Adolf Anderssen and Jean Dufresne in Leipzig, Berlin, Dresden, and Bremen.

In 1853 Falkbeer was allowed to return to Vienna.  Two years later, in January 1855, he started the first Austrian chess magazine, Wiener Schachzeitung, which lasted only a few months.  He went to London where he played two matches against Henry Bird.  Falkbeer lost the 1856 match (+1 −2), but won the 1856/7 match (+5 −4 =4).  At the Birmingham 1858 knockout tournament he beat Saint-Amant in round two (+2 −1), but lost in the round four final to Johann Löwenthal (+1 −3 =4) to finish second.

Falkbeer edited a  chess column for The Sunday Times from April 1857 to November 1859.
He returned to Vienna in 1864, later writing a chess column in Neue Illustrierte Zeitung from 1877 to 1885. He died in Vienna on December 14, 1885.

Legacy
Falkbeer is more famous for his contributions to chess theory than for his individual play.  He introduced the Falkbeer Countergambit, still considered one of the main lines in the King's Gambit Declined. Siegbert Tarrasch held the view that Falkbeer's Countergambit refuted the King's Gambit entirely.

References

External links 
 
 

1819 births
1885 deaths
Sportspeople from Brno
Austrian chess players
Chess writers
Chess theoreticians
19th-century chess players
Austrian magazine founders